The men's tournament of basketball at the 2011 Pan American Games in Guadalajara, Mexico began on October 26 and ended on October 30, when Puerto Rico defeated Mexico 74-72 for the gold medal. All games were held at the CODE Dome. The defending champion was Brazil, who won the title on their home court.

Qualification
Three teams automatically qualified to compete in this tournament, the hosts Mexico, Canada and the United States. The rest qualified through two regional tournaments.

Format
 Eight teams are split into 2 preliminary round groups of 4 teams each. The top 2 teams from each group qualify for the knockout stage.
 The third and fourth placed teams will play the fifth to eight bracket.
 In the semifinals, the matchups are as follows: A1 vs. B2 and B1 vs. A2
 The winning teams from the semifinals play for the gold medal. The losing teams compete for the bronze medal.

Ties are broken via the following the criteria, with the first option used first, all the way down to the last option:
 Head to head results.
 Goal average (not the goal difference) between the tied teams.
 Goal average of the tied teams for all teams in its group.

Squads

At the start of tournament, all eight participating countries had 12 players on their rosters. Final squads for the tournament were due on September 14, 2011, a month  before the start of 2011 Pan American Games.

Draw
The draw for the tournament was held at the Weightlifting Forum, the venue for the Weightlifting at the games in Guadalajara on June 26 and was conducted by FIBA Americas Technical Director, Mr. Anibal García.

The competing are drawn to each group by couples to secure a balance in the competition. The first team selected randomly in the draw goes to group A and the second to Group B. Mexico as host nation got to choose which team from the first pot it played, Argentina.

Each team is listed with their world ranking before the draw.

Preliminary round
All times are local Central Daylight Time (UTC-5)

Group A

Group B

Final phase

Semifinals

Seventh place match

Fifth place match

Bronze medal match

Gold medal match

Final standings

Medalists

References

 
Men's tournament